Dr. Alexander Jacob IPS (born 25 May 1955) is an Indian retired police officer. He rose to the rank of Director General of Police in the Kerala police force heading the prisons department and later assumed charge as the managing director of Kerala Police Housing Construction Corporation. At present he is the Nodal Officer of National University for Police Sciences and Security Studies (NUPSAS).

Education 
Jacob was born to parents who were both school teachers at Thumpamon near Pandalam, Kerala. He had his school education at St. Goretti's School, Nalanchira, Trivandrum and at Mar Gregorios School, Thumpamon.

He studied pre-degree at St. Xavier's College, Trivandrum and B.Sc Chemistry  at Mar Ivanios College. He studied at Master's Degree level in English, History, Politics and Sociology. and received an MPhil. degree for his thesis on low cost policing.  He undertook research for a PhD in English Literature on Historical Novels of Indo-Anglian Literature.

Early career 

He started his career as a subeditor in Malayala Manorama, the leading newspaper in Kerala and then as a lecturer in at Mar Ivanios College. He was placed first in the bank officers exam and was assigned  Indian Overseas Bank but he refused to join the banking sector as he felt it was not his cup of tea. He was recruited to the Indian Police Service (IPS) in 1982.

IPS Officer 
After his probation, Jacob was posted as Superintendent of Police, Kottayam and subsequently at Kannur. He also worked as the Commissioner of Police, Kochi City in 1990. He was the principal of Police Training College, Trivandrum during 1992-1995. On promotion he was posted as Deputy Inspector General of Police (DIG), Northern Range (Kerala) and subsequently as DIG, Armed Police Battalion.

He was the Director of Kerala Women's Commission taking over his assignment as Secretary, Institute of Management in Government in January 1999. In May 2000 he was posted as Joint Director of Kerala Police Academy. He was promoted as IGP and posted Inspector General of Police (Training), Kerala State and Ex Officio Joint Director Kerala Police Academy in 2001. In 2006 he was promoted to the Director of Kerala Police Academy. Dr.Jacob is also involved in teaching many different groups of students in the Civil Service and wider public. He gives talks based on the Bible through the programme Njanavachassukal on Shalom TV India.

Awards 

He was awarded the President's Scout Award in 1972. He won Best Probationer Award (Co-curricular activities) and L.B. Sewa Cup from IPS Academy, Hyderabad in 1983. He was honored as the most outstanding Young Person of Kerala by the Junior Chamber, Jaycees in 1989 and as most outstanding Young Person of India by the Indian Junior Chamber Jaycees in 1990.

He was awarded the President's 'Police Medal' for Meritorious Service by the President of India on the Republic Day, 2004.

Family 

He is married to Dr Elizabeth John, a Reader in the Collegiate Education Department. The couple have three daughters Mariam Elizabeth Alexander, Jesse Elizabeth Alexander and Ammu Elizabeth Alexander.

References 

1955 births
Living people
Indian police officers
Kerala Police officers
Syro-Malankara Catholics
People from Pathanamthitta district